= Maksi, Bhopal =

Maksi
- village
- Location within Madhya Pradesh Location within India
- Coordinates: 23.153125°N 77.497266°E
- Country: India
- State: Madhya Pradesh
- District: Bhopal
- Tehsil: Huzur

Population (2011)
  - Total: 254
- Time zone: UTC+5:30 (IST)
- ISO 3166 code: MP-IN
- Census code: 482553

Maksi is a village in the Bhopal district of Madhya Pradesh, India. It is located in the Huzur tehsil and the Phanda block.

== Demographics ==
According to the 2011 census of India, Maksi has 42 households. The effective literacy rate (i.e. the literacy rate of population excluding children aged 6 and below) is 71.36%.

Demographics (2011 Census)
	Total	Male	Female
Population	254	131	123
Children aged below 6 years	55	27	28
Scheduled caste	8	3	5
Scheduled tribe	34	19	15
Literates	142	88	54
Workers (all)	87	68	19
Main workers (total)	80	68	12
Main workers: Cultivators	46	44	2
Main workers: Agricultural labourers	23	14	9
Main workers: Household industry workers	0	0	0
Main workers: Other	11	10	1
Marginal workers (total)	7	0	7
Marginal workers: Cultivators	0	0	0
Marginal workers: Agricultural labourers	6	0	6
Marginal workers: Household industry workers	0	0	0
Marginal workers: Others	1	0	1
Non-workers	167	63	104
